In computing, a CURIE (or Compact URI) defines a generic, abbreviated syntax for expressing Uniform Resource Identifiers (URIs). It is an abbreviated URI expressed in a compact syntax, and may be found in both XML and non-XML grammars. A CURIE may be considered a datatype.

An example of CURIE syntax: [isbn:0393315703]

The square brackets may be used to prevent ambiguities between CURIEs and regular URIs, yielding so-called safe CURIEs.

QNames (the namespace prefixes used in XML) often are used as a CURIE, and may be considered a type of CURIE. CURIEs, as defined by the W3C, will be better defined and may include checking.  Unlike QNames, the part of a CURIE after the colon does not need to conform to the rules for XML element names.

The first W3C Working Draft of CURIE syntax was released 7 March 2007.

The final recommendation was released 16 December 2010.

Example
This example is based on one from the W3C Working Draft 7 March 2007, using a QName syntax within XHTML.

 
     <head>...</head>
     <body>
         <p>
             Find out more about <a href="">biomes</a>.
         </p>
     </body>
 </html>

The definition ("<html xmlns:wikipedia="http://en.wikipedia.org/wiki/">") is highlighted in yellow
The CURIE ("[wikipedia:Biome]") is highlighted in green

See also
QName
Notation3
RDF/XML
Turtle (syntax)

References

External links
W3C Candidate Recommendation 16 January 2009 

World Wide Web Consortium standards
Computer-related introductions in 2009
URI schemes